Carlos Alberto Cánepa La Cotera is a Peruvian politician and a Congressman representing Tumbes for the 2006–2011 term. Canepa belongs to the Union for Peru.

External links

Official Congressional Site
Hijo De Isabel de Lourdes La Cotera Briones

Living people
Year of birth missing (living people)
Union for Peru politicians
Members of the Congress of the Republic of Peru